Jordan Bernard Murphy (born February 28, 1997) is a Puerto Rican-Virgin Islander professional basketball player for the Austin Spurs of the NBA G League. He played college basketball for the Minnesota Golden Gophers. He is the all-time Golden Gopher career rebound and career double-double leader. He ranks second in Big Ten Conference history (to Jerry Lucas) in career rebounds.

High school career
Murphy led his middle school to a 75-0 record. As a senior, he helped William J. Brennan High School post a 31–3 record by averaging 23.6 points, 10.5 rebounds, 3.1 assists and 1.9 steals per game and earned Class 6A All-state recognition as a senior from the Texas Association of Basketball Coaches. Murphy committed to play for VCU on November 13, 2014. When VCU head coach Shaka Smart left VCU to coach Texas the following April, Murphy asked his successor Will Wade to be released from his commitment. Wade granted the release. At the time, Murphy already had interest from Oregon, UCLA, Gonzaga, and Miami. Minnesota invited him for a visit on May 11, after which he signed with Minnesota that Friday.

College career

Freshman year
As a freshman for the 2015–16 team, he was twice named Big Ten Conference Freshman of the week. Murphys 24-point/10-rebound November 30, 2015, double-double against Clemson and his 19-point/17-rebound December 5 double-double against South Dakota were the first back-to-back double-doubles by a Minnesota freshman since Kris Humphries for the 2003–04 Gophers, which earned his first Big Ten Conference Freshman of the week on December 7. No Minnesota freshman had even posted a single double-double since Humphries and the 24 points was the highest total by a Minnesota freshman since Andre Hollins of the 2011–12 Gophers. The December 5 game included a Murphy tip in with 1 second remaining to send the game to overtime. On February 18, Murphy posted 18 points, 6 rebounds and 6 assists against number six ranked Maryland, helping 0–13 Minnesota earn its first conference win and earning his second Big Ten Conference Freshman of the week honor on February 22. Following the 2015–16 Big Ten Conference men's basketball season, he was named to the All-Freshman Big Ten team along with Thomas Bryant, Diamond Stone, Ethan Happ and Caleb Swanigan.

Sophomore year
As a sophomore, he was Co-Big Ten Player of the Week (along with Derrick Walton) on February 13, 2017, following a February 8 25-point/19-rebound/4-block double overtime performance against Iowa and a February 11 17-point/11-rebound effort against Rutgers. After the 2016–17 Big Ten Conference men's basketball season, he was an All-Big Ten Conference third team selection by the Big Ten coaches and media. The national media recognized him as a second team Associated Press All-Big Ten selection.

Junior year
Although teammates Amir Coffey and Nate Mason were selected preseason All-Big Ten, Murphy was not. However, he was a Karl Malone Award preseason watchlist selectee. Murphy opened the season with a career-high 35 points and added 15 rebounds against USC Upstate. On the strength of 7 consecutive double-doubles for the 2017–18 Minnesota Golden Gophers, he won the first three Big Ten Player of the Week awards (a feat last achieved by Evan Turner in the 2009–10 Big Ten Conference men's basketball season). On January 6, because of first half foul trouble Murphy needed 9 second-half rebounds including one with 8 seconds remaining against Indiana to tie Tim Duncan's NCAA record for most consecutive double-doubles to start a season (17). On January 10, Murphy's streak ended against Northwestern. Following the 2017–18 Big Ten Conference men's basketball regular season, Murphy was named an All-Big Ten second team selection by the media and third team selection by the coaches.

Senior year
Murphy was a preseason All-Big Ten selection by the Big Ten Media. Prior to the season he was one of nine Big Ten players named to the preseason John R. Wooden Award watchlist. Murphy was named MVP of the November Vancouver Showcase after averaging 15.7 points, 11.7 rebounds and 3.8 assists in wins over Texas A&M, Santa Clara and Washington. In the Santa Clara win on November 20, Murphy surpassed Mychal Thompson as the Minnesota Golden Gopher career rebound leader. Murphy tied Jim Brewer as the Minnesota all-time double-double producer with 24 points and 16 rebounds on November 30 against Oklahoma State and surpassed him two games later on December 5 with 18 points and 13 rebounds against Nebraska. On January 9, Murphy was one of 7 Big Ten athletes included on the Wooden Award Men's Midseason Top 25 watchlist. On January 22, Murphy was one of 4 Big Ten athletes named to the Naismith Defensive Player of the Year Award Top 15 midseason watchlist. After leading Minnesota to a win over (#19/21) Iowa on January 27 with 23 points, 11 rebounds and six assists, he moved past Joe Barry Carroll into second place on the all-time Big Ten career rebound list (behind Jerry Lucas). On January 28, Murphy earned Co-Big Ten Player of the Week recognition, thus becoming the first Golden Gopher to earn 5 Big Ten Player of the Week recognitions. On February 7, Murphy was one of two Big Ten athletes (along with Iggy Brazdeikis) named a Karl Malone Award Top 10 finalist. Following a pair of double-doubles against Nebraska and Indiana Murphy added a 6th Big Ten Player of the Week award on February 18. Following the season, he was a 2019 First team All-Big Ten selection by the media and second team selection by the coaches. On March 12, the U.S. Basketball Writers Association named Murphy to its 2012–13 Men's All-District V (OH, IN, IL, MI, MN, WI) Team, based upon voting from its national membership.  He was named to the  National Association of Basketball Coaches Division I All‐District 7 first team on March 21, as selected and voted on by member coaches of the NABC, making him eligible for the 2019 NABC Coaches’ Division I All-America team. He averaged 17.3 points and 9.3 rebounds in the 2019 Big Ten Conference men's basketball tournament, earning a spot on the All-tournament team. He led the Big Ten in rebounding average (11.0).

Professional career

Iowa Wolves (2019–2020)

After going undrafted in the 2019 NBA draft, Murphy signed an NBA Summer League contract with the Minnesota Timberwolves. On September 16, 2019, Murphy signed another contract with the Minnesota Timberwolves. He was released by the Timberwolves on October 14, 2019 and later added to the roster of their NBA G League affiliate, the Iowa Wolves. On January 2, 2020, Murphy posted 24 points on 10-of-15 shooting, 13 rebounds and two blocks in a 102-100 loss to the Northern Arizona Suns.  Murphy averaged 9.6 points per game.

Ironi Nes Ziona (2020)
On August 23, 2020, Murphy signed with Ironi Nes Ziona of the Israeli Premier League.

Return to the Iowa Wolves (2021)
In February 2021, Murphy returned to Iowa

Leones de Ponce (2021)
On April 11, 2021, Murphy signed with Leones de Ponce of the BSN.

Austin Spurs (2022)
On January 3, 2022, Murphy was acquired by the Austin Spurs of the NBA G League.

Return to Leones de Ponce (2022)
After the conclusion of the G League season, Murphy returned to Leones de Ponce.

Return to Austin (2022–present)
On October 24, 2022, Murphy rejoined the Austin Spurs roster for training camp.

International career
Murphy represented the United States Virgin Islands under-17 national team at the 2013 Centrobasket U17 Championship.

On October 27, 2021, the Puerto Rican Basketball Federation announced that they had asked the Virgin Islands Basketball Federation for his release in order for him to be able to represent the Puerto Rican national basketball team in future competitions.

Career statistics

College

|-
| style="text-align:left;"| 2015–16
| style="text-align:left;"| Minnesota
|| 31 || 20 || 26.5 || .461 || .220 || .612 || 8.0 || .7 || 1.0 || 1.0 || 11.6
|-
| style="text-align:left;"| 2016–17
| style="text-align:left;"| Minnesota
|| 34 || 34 || 27.5 || .502 || .125 || .615 || 8.8 || .9 || .7 || 1.1 || 11.3
|-
| style="text-align:left;"| 2017–18 
| style="text-align:left;"| Minnesota
|| 32 || 32 || 31.8 || .525 || .314 || .699 || 11.3 || 1.4 || 1.2 || 1.0 || 16.8
|-
| style="text-align:left;"| 2018–19 
| style="text-align:left;"| Minnesota 
|| 36 || 36 || 31.1 || .487 || .267 || .683 || 11.0 || 2.6 || .6 || .8 || 14.4
|- class="sortbottom"
| style="text-align:center;" colspan="2"| Career
|| 133 || 122 || 29.3 || .495 || .232 || .659 || 9.8 || 1.4 || .9 || 1.0 || 13.5

References

External links
 Minnesota Golden Gophers bio
 ESPN stats

1997 births
Living people
American men's basketball players
American people of Virgin Islands descent
Austin Spurs players
Basketball players from San Antonio
Iowa Wolves players
Leones de Ponce basketball players
Minnesota Golden Gophers men's basketball players
Power forwards (basketball)
Puerto Rican people of United States Virgin Islands descent
United States Virgin Islands men's basketball players